Yosef Eliyahu Chelouche (1870 – 23 July 1934) was one of the founders of Tel Aviv, an entrepreneur, businessman, and industrialist.

Early life
Yosef Eliyahu Chelouche was born in Jaffa, Ottoman Syria. His father, Aharon Chelouche, one of the prominent figures of the local Maghrebi Jewish community, was a goldsmith, money changer and land dealer. He was educated in a Jewish Talmud Torah and in the Tifereth Israel Jewish school in Beirut. His marriage at the age of 17 had put an end to his formal education, and he turned to the field of trade. During the early 1890s he opened in Jaffa, together with his elder brother Avraham Haim Chelouche, a store for building materials under the name of Chelouche Frères. The same name was used some years later also for a factory for cement-based prefabricated building products founded by the brothers, which operated until the end of the 1920s.

Business and public activities
His business in the field of construction and the land trades of his father made Chelouche involved in the actual process of building. He started working also as a building contractor, a framework in which he got to build different kinds of buildings in northern Jaffa and later in Tel Aviv, the most significant of them were the Feingold Houses in Yefeh Nof (Bella Vista) neighborhood, the Girls School and the Alliance School in Neve Tzedek, 32 of the first dwellings of Ahuzat Bait neighborhood (later to be Tel Aviv) and the edifice of the Herzliya Hebrew Gymnasium. During the same time he also occupied himself – single-handedly or cooperating with others – in the business of land purchase in the environs of Tel Aviv and also in other parts of the country. Besides his private business, Chelouche dedicated much of his time for public matters. Above all was his concern for the development of the two cities he had spent his life in – Jaffa and Tel Aviv – and for its inhabitants welfare. Along with his wife, Freha Simha Chelouche (née Moyal), he was among the first founders of Tel Aviv. After World War I he was a member of the town's first local council. During the 1920s he was also a member of Jaffa's city council. In his public activities he initiated and conceived many ideas for the improvement and enhancement of the city, ideas which not once  were carried out by others.

Between Hebrew and Arab cultures
Chelouche was fluent in Arabic, and the language helped him in many times to play the role of a mediator between the Jewish and Arab inhabitants of Tel Aviv and Jaffa and to bring them together. Thanks to the friendly relationship he made with the leaders of the Arab populace he could find an attentive ear among them during times of peace as well as incidents and tension. As a member of Hamagen association, Chelouche had made many efforts, even before World War I, to convince, through essays published in Arab newspapers and meeting with Arab public figures, that there is no inherent conflict of interests between the Jewish settlement in Palestine and the Arab aspirations regarding the same territory. After the war, when the national conflict between Arabs and Jews became explicit and violent, Chelouche tried his best to offer both Jews and Arabs with a different perspective on their inevitable mutual life, although his views had become more and more unpopular.

Later years and death
During the last years of his life, Chelouche was moving away from public affairs, although still active in several associations, among them The World Sephardic Association in Tel Aviv. During those years he wrote and published essays in Hebrew and Arabic newspapers, trying to express a different, non-partisan, voice regarding the questions of life in Palestine. Yosef Eliyahu and Freha Simha Chelouche had seven children – Moshe, Meyir, Avner, Tzadok, Hilel, Yehudit and Yoram. Yosef Eliyahu Chelouche died 23 July 1934, three months after the death of his wife. After Chelouche's death, the city of Tel Aviv named a street after him (Yosef Eliyahu Street), located near Fredric R. Mann Auditorium (Heichal Ha-Tarbut) in the heart of the city.chelouche salah

His memoirs
During the 1920s, Chelouche devoted himself to the writing of his memoir, called in Hebrew Parashat Hayai (Reminiscences of My Life), which he regarded as his legacy to the future generations living in Palestine. Chelouche's book portrays his life, spanning from his childhood to the bloody incidents in Palestine in August 1929. Being a native born Palestinian who was an active player in the events that took place during the region's historic transformations, Chelouche's view, as revealed by his memoir, is colorful, vivid and fascinating. Chelouche describes his childhood in Jaffa, his years in a high-class Jewish boarding school in Beirut, his early marriage and his first steps in the field of construction. Later on, Chelouche recites his close involvement in the establishment of Tel Aviv as a constructor and local activist. A considerable part of the book is devoted to the events of World War I in Palestine, including the deportation of the inhabitants of Tel Aviv to the northern parts of the land. The period after World War I is portrayed in Chelouche's memoir as a time of decline in the relations between Jews and Arabs. Chelouche recalls his personal efforts to secure peace in spite of the increasing tensions. The book concludes with two complementary essays: an open letter to the Arab people that was published in a Syrian newspaper following the 1929 incidents, and an epilogue in which Chelouche analyzes the relations between the different peoples living in Palestine. Regarding the historic role of the Palestinian-born Jews, Chelouche wrote the following words (as translated by Addy Cohen):
And whoever is knowledgeable about the history of our Yishuv from beginning till now, knows that getting closer to our neighbors and making peace with them was our first obligation, the natives, and we fulfilled it according to our conception, and if we succeeded in our task – and it was a great success – it was because we respected our neighbors and we took into consideration the fact that we had to live next to them in good relations if we need to build our Yishuv in this land.However – and we utter here the bitter and terrible truth – the truth is that our leaders and many of the founders of the Yishuv who came from the Diaspora in order to lead us, did not comprehend the high value of relations between neighbors at all, this basic and simple rule. Perhaps they did not understand, or did not want to pay attention to it, but in doing so, they are guilty of not coping with the problem, which gradually became more and more complicated, till it became the most painful problem of the Yishuv. Many have already written about it, discussed it and commented on it publicly, that since the day of Herzl’s appearance with the idea of the political Zionism, the Zionist propaganda in all countries and languages described the land where we were going to establish our National Home, as a land of desert and desolation, where nobody dwelt, and it was on the basis of this description, in writing and by heart, that it was only a virgin land, that all the Zionist methods of the establishment of the Yishuv were developed, and they included all but one thing, the attention to those inhabitants who had already been living in this land.[...]And this attitude of indifference by the new immigrants, to their neighbors in the country, the country they meant to settle and live in. Due to this attitude, our neighbors did not wish to appreciate the great benefit of our settlement activity, which was valuable to them as well. They were not satisfied with our sons, probably due to the indifference of the leaders of the Yishuv, although they knew that the greater part of the national and private capital of the Jews passed into their hands in various ways. And only due to this attitude of indifference, they were not satisfied to acknowledge this important fact, that they also gained many reforms and improvements in their economic and cultural life.

What have they seen in us and in our work from the beginning of our settlement till today? Only cold indifference, estrangement and alienation, and in addition, they also heard from our chief spokesman in the Zionist press a lot of idle talk and nonsense that sometimes caused us a lot of damage.
And a very interesting fact is that the Muslim Arabs, the enlightened ones among them, tried several times in the past, to find ways to get closer to us, because many of them already then and know it today that the Jews are the only element that can bring the progress in the development, in all its aspects, to this desolate land. And the bright people among them, know also that their opposition now is only artificial, created by outside causes, by agitators. And they, as well as us, the natives, know it clearly that it is very possible to create a relationship of mutual understanding between us and them. We only have to work with tact and cautious psychological understanding, to make this relationship that was so much damaged, and apply it in concrete and true steps, mainly in correct deeds and actions, to attain the goal.
And we have to build the bridge between us and them, because otherwise, all our work in the Yishuv will be delayed, because it relies only on our poor resources and on British bayonets, which may change according to the spirit of the time and the political situation of the Empire, as in the biblical formula from the era of the War between Amalek and Moses, when Moses hands where heavy they raised his hands and Israel won the battle and vice versa, and it is impossible for us to feel completely safe and we must not rely on British bayonets.
We can build this bridge if we only adopt this true outlook, that this Land is OUR LONDON, that only here in this land can we find the solution to this problem, and also if approach it with pure and correct attitude, with true and compassionate relationship, not one sided, by party politics or foreign motives, which are contrary to the way of peace and truth.[...]

My greatest wish is that the chapters in my book, where I tell and describe my true and compassionate relationship with our neighbors, the Muslims, would motivate the ones who intend to deal with the problem of our relationships with our neighbors, to use another method and other tactics, the methods and tactics of the natives, who have a lot of experience in the relationships with our neighbors, and to correct, as much as possible, the twisted relations with them.
Parashat Hayai was published in Tel Aviv in 1931 but was not widely distributed. In spite of that, the book became a unique source for historic research of the times and places it depicted, though its humanistic messages were mostly neglected. Due to its original perspective on the possibility of Jewish-Arab coexistence, Tel-Aviv based Babel publishers published an annotated edition of the book in 2005.

References

External links
  Book review on Reminiscences of My Life.
  Author page in Babel publishers site, including some of his essays (in Hebrew).

1870 births
1934 deaths
Israeli businesspeople
Algerian Jews
People from Jaffa
Sephardi Jews in Ottoman Palestine
Sephardi Jews in Mandatory Palestine
Yosef Eliyahu
Burials at Trumpeldor Cemetery